Patrick Henry Moynihan (September 25, 1869 – May 20, 1946) was an American businessman and politician from Chicago, Illinois. A Republican, he was most notable for his service representing the 2nd District of Illinois in the United States House of Representatives from 1933 to 1935.

Biography
Moynihan was born in Chicago on September 25, 1869, the son of John Moynihan and Celia (O'Donnell) Moynihan. He attended the public schools of Chicago and the city's St. Patrick's High School and became active in publishing and printing as a typesetter, and worked his way up to president of the Calumet Publishing Company. He later became vice president of the Calumet Coal Company, one of the largest in the Chicago area. Moynihan's additional business interests included serving as president of the Hiawatha Phonograph Company. In addition, he also served as president of the South Chicago Businessmen's Club.

A Republican, from 1901 to 1909, Moynihan was a member of the Chicago Board of Aldermen. From 1921 to 1929 he was a member of the Illinois Commerce Commission, and he was the commission chairman from 1928 to 1929.

In 1932 Moynihan was elected to the United States House of Representatives. He served in the 73rd Congress (March 4, 1933 to January 3, 1935). Moynihan was an unsuccessful candidate for reelection in 1934, and for election in 1936 and 1940.

After leaving Congress, Moynihan returned to his Chicago business interests. He died in Chicago on May 20, 1946. Moynihan was buried at Mount Olivet Cemetery in Chicago.

References

External links

1869 births
1946 deaths
Chicago City Council members
Republican Party members of the United States House of Representatives from Illinois